Olindias phosphorica, or cigar jellyfish, is a species of hydrozoan from the central and eastern Atlantic and the Mediterranean Sea. 
The Mediterranean sea is a predominantly warm body of water, thus O. phosphorica is a warm-water Jellyfish. Global warming has facilitated the proliferation of the species throughout the Mediterranean sea.

References

Olindiidae
Animals described in 1841